Disciples of the Sun is the fourth studio album by the Danish power metal band Pyramaze, released on 22 May 2015.

This album features a significantly different lineup than the band's previous records. Pyramaze recruited vocalist Terje Harøy to replace Matt Barlow and Urban Breed (with whom Pyramaze did not make a release) after their departures, and producer Jacob Hansen replaced Michael Kammeyer on guitars while remaining the band's producer. The album's title track had a music video produced to promote the album, a first for the band.

Reception 

Disciples of the Sun was generally well-received, and was compared favourably to the band's previous efforts.

Track listing

Personnel 
 Jacob Hansen − guitars, bass
 Morten Gade Sørensen − drums
 Jonah Weingarten − keyboards
 Toke Skjønnemand − guitars
 Terje Harøy − vocals

References

External links 
 Pyramaze homepage

Pyramaze albums
2015 albums
Albums produced by Jacob Hansen